Kumara Welgama (born 5 April 1950) is a Sri Lankan politician and a current member of parliament for the Kalutara District. Welgama had been a minister of the Sri Lanka Freedom Party in the past. Since 2020, he has been the leader of the New Lanka Freedom Party and contested elections with the Samagi Jana Balawegaya.

Welgama was the chief organiser for the Sri Lanka Freedom Party in the Agalawatte electorate between 1984 and 2000. Welgamaa was the Minister of Industrial Development from 2007 to 2010 and the Minister of Transportation from 2010 to early 2015 in governments led by the SLFP.

Welgama had been a member of the Sri Lanka Freedom Party until 2019, when he defected from the party after it supported the presidential candidacy of Gotabaya Rajapaksa, paving the way for the return of the Rajapaksa family. He supported UNP candidate Sajith Premadasa instead and founded a new party named New Lanka Freedom Party, which joined the Samagi Jana Balawegaya alliance led by Sajith Premadasa to run for the 2020 Sri Lankan parliamentary election.

References

1950 births
Living people
Alumni of S. Thomas' College, Mount Lavinia
Industries ministers of Sri Lanka
Sri Lankan Buddhists
Members of the 10th Parliament of Sri Lanka
Members of the 11th Parliament of Sri Lanka
Members of the 12th Parliament of Sri Lanka
Members of the 13th Parliament of Sri Lanka
Members of the 14th Parliament of Sri Lanka
Members of the 15th Parliament of Sri Lanka
Members of the 16th Parliament of Sri Lanka
Prisoners and detainees of Sri Lanka
Sri Lanka Freedom Party politicians
Sri Lankan prisoners and detainees
Transport ministers of Sri Lanka
United People's Freedom Alliance politicians
Samagi Jana Balawegaya politicians